Alain N'Kong (born 6 April 1979) is a Cameroonian former professional football who played as a midfielder.

Club career
N'Kong was born in Yaoundé, Cameroon. Early in his career, he played all over the world, including Las Palmas in Spain, Nacional in Uruguay, and FC Paços de Ferreira in Portugal.

N'Kong signed with MLS club Colorado Rapids prior to the 2005 season. Despite having a successful season, he was released in November 2005. He returned to Colorado in August 2006 but was again waived at the end of the season, subsequently joining Atlante F.C.

On 11 August 2007, he scored the first goal in the newly renovated Estadio Quintana Roo in Cancún as well as his first goal for Atlante, against Pumas. He became the first African player to win a league title in Mexico, in Apertura 2007 with Atlante. After Atlante won its championship, N'Kong was released from the team becoming a free agent.

In the Apertura 2008 he returned to Mexico where he played with Club Leon in the Primera "A".

He signed with French side US Boulogne in November 2008 on a one-season deal.

N'Kong went on to play for Indios de Ciudad Juarez for the Apertura 2009, he signed a one-year contract. On 5 April 2012, he joined Arema Indonesia (ISL).

N'Kong moved to Persepam Madura Utama in 2012.

International career
N'Kong represented Cameroon at various youth levels and appeared with the full national team in qualifiers for the 2002 FIFA World Cup.

On 7 February 2008, he scored the winning goal with a finish from a Samuel Eto'o through pass which sent Cameroon into the final of the 2008 Africa Cup of Nations knocking out hosts Ghana. Cameroon lost the final 0–1 against defending champions Egypt.

Career statistics
Scores and results list Cameroon's goal tally first.

Honours

Canon Yaoundé
Cameroonian Cup: 1999

Villa Española
Uruguayan Segunda División: 2001

Atlante
Mexican Primera División: Apertura 2007

León
Primera División A: Clausura 2008

Cameroon
Africa Cup of Nations runner-up:2008

References

External links
 
 Profile at FrenchLeague.com

1979 births
Living people
Cameroonian footballers
Footballers from Yaoundé
Association football midfielders
Cameroon international footballers
2008 Africa Cup of Nations players
La Liga players
Major League Soccer players
Liga MX players
Ligue 2 players
Liga 1 (Indonesia) players
Canon Yaoundé players
S.C. Freamunde players
C.S.D. Villa Española players
UD Las Palmas players
F.C. Paços de Ferreira players
Club Nacional de Football players
Colorado Rapids players
Atlante F.C. footballers
Club León footballers
US Boulogne players
Indios de Ciudad Juárez footballers
Aceh United F.C. players
Arema F.C. players
Persebaya Surabaya players
Persepam Madura Utama players
Cameroonian expatriate sportspeople in Portugal
Expatriate footballers in Portugal
Cameroonian expatriate sportspeople in Uruguay
Expatriate footballers in Uruguay
Cameroonian expatriate sportspeople in Spain
Expatriate footballers in Spain
Cameroonian expatriate sportspeople in the United States
Expatriate soccer players in the United States
Cameroonian expatriate sportspeople in Mexico
Expatriate footballers in Mexico
Cameroonian expatriate sportspeople in France
Expatriate footballers in France
Cameroonian expatriate sportspeople in Indonesia
Expatriate footballers in Indonesia